Gerulata was a Roman military camp located near today's Rusovce, a borough of Bratislava, Slovakia. It was part of the Roman province of Pannonia and was built in the 2nd century as a part of the frontier defence system. It was abandoned in the 4th century, when Roman legions withdrew from Pannonia.

Today there is a museum, which is part of the Bratislava City Museum.

Archaeologists have unearthed its remnants and their discoveries are on exhibition in the hall of the museum, which is open in summer and can be found behind the Catholic Church of St Mary Magdalene in the town.
Beyond the remains of the Roman forum, fragments of structures and gravestones, bronze, iron, ceramic and stone pieces are on show in a museum showing daily life.

The best preserved object is a quadrilateral building 30 metres long and 30 metres wide, with 2.4 metre thick walls.

In July 2021, Gerulata was added to the UNESCO's World Heritage List as part of the Western segment of the Danubian Limes of the Roman Empire.

References

 http://slovakianguide.com/en/bratislava-city-museum-ancient-gerulata-rusovce

External links
 Gerulata 

History of Bratislava
Roman frontiers
Archaeological sites in Slovakia
Roman sites in Slovakia
Roman legionary fortresses in Slovakia
Tourist attractions in Bratislava
Buildings and structures in Bratislava